Midnight Drive may refer to:

Music 

 Midnight Drive (Tommy Emmanuel album), a 1997 album originally named Can't Get Enough
 Midnight Drive, an album by The Kinsey Report
 Midnight Drive, Stephen Ross's 1991 album featuring Jens Johansson on keyboards
 "Midnight Drive", a song by Rustie from disc 1 of the Warp20 compilation album
 "Midnight Drive", a song from the 2005 music video game Dance Dance Revolution Mario Mix by Nintendo and Konami

Other 

 The Midnight Drives, 2007 British comedy-drama film